Turris burroensis is an extinct species of sea snail, a marine gastropod mollusk in the family Turridae, the turrids.

Description
Measurenements of the shell: 13.5 x 5.8 mm.

Distribution
Fossils of this marine species were found in Eocene strata in California, USA.

References

 Nelson, Richard Newman. A contribution to the paleontology of the Martinez Eocene of California. Vol. 11. University of California Press, 1924.
 Kooser, Marilyn Ann. Stratigraphy and sedimentology of the San Francisquito Formation, Transverse Ranges, California. University of California, Riverside, 1980.

External links
 Mineralienatlas - Fossilienatlas: Turris burroensis

burroensis
Gastropods described in 1925